John Lynch (November 1, 1843 – August 17, 1910) was an American lawyer and politician who served as a Democratic member of the U.S. House of Representatives from Pennsylvania.

Biography
John Lynch was born in Providence, Rhode Island.  In 1856, he moved to Pennsylvania with his parents, who settled in Wilkes-Barre, Pennsylvania.  He attended the public schools and Wyoming Seminary in Kingston, Pennsylvania.  He worked on a farm and in the coal mines and taught school.  He studied law, was admitted to the bar November 1, 1868, and commenced practice in Wilkes-Barre.

Congress
Lynch was elected as a Democrat to the Fiftieth Congress.  He was an unsuccessful candidate for reelection in 1888.  He resumed the practice of law in Wilkes-Barre, and served as judge of the court of common pleas from 1892 to 1910.

Death
He died in Atlantic City, New Jersey, in 1910.  Interment in St. Mary's Cemetery in Wilkes-Barre.

Sources

The Political Graveyard

1843 births
1910 deaths
Pennsylvania lawyers
Democratic Party members of the United States House of Representatives from Pennsylvania
People from the Scranton–Wilkes-Barre metropolitan area
19th-century American politicians
19th-century American judges
19th-century American lawyers
Judges of the Pennsylvania Courts of Common Pleas